"Hey Girl (This Is Our Time)" is a song by Australian boy band CDB, released in March 1995 as the second single from their debut studio album, Glide with Me (1995). The song peaked at number 14 on the Australian ARIA Singles Chart in May 1995. In New Zealand the single became CDB's second number-one single, peaking at number one on the week of 21 April 1996 and earning a Gold sales certification.

Chart performance
In Australia, "Hey Girl (This is Our Time)" debuted at No. 49 in March 1995 before rising to a peak of No. 14 in May 1995, remaining in the top 50 for 11 weeks. In New Zealand, the song became the band's second number-one single in April 1996, following "Let's Groove", which peaked at number one in February.

Track listing
'''CD single (661108 2)
 "Hey Girl (This Is Our Time)" – 3:41
 "Hey Girl (This Is Our Time)" (Sentimental Mix) – 3:53
 "Hey Girl (This Is Our Time)" (Instrumental)  – 4:10
 "Break of Day" – 4:48

Charts

Certifications

See also
 List of number-one singles from the 1990s (New Zealand)

References

1995 singles
Number-one singles in New Zealand
CDB (band) songs
1994 songs
Sony Music Australia singles
Songs written by Paul Gray (songwriter)
Songs written by Andrew De Silva